Vĩnh Hưng A is a rural commune (xã) and village in Vĩnh Lợi District, Bạc Liêu Province, in south-western Vietnam.

References

Populated places in Bạc Liêu province
Communes of Bạc Liêu province